Allison White (1816–1886) was a U.S. Representative from Pennsylvania.

Allison or Alison White or Whyte may also refer to:

Allison Benis White, American poet
Alison White (cricketer) (1881–1962), England and Gloucestershire cricketer
Alison White (bishop) (born 1956), British Anglican bishop 
Alison Whyte (born 1968), Australian actress
Allison White, a character in the TV series The Colony